Dinosaurs on Other Planets is a short story collection by Danielle McLaughlin, published by The Stinging Fly in 2015.

Awards 

 Joint winner, Windham–Campbell Literature Prize, fiction category in 2019
 Winner, Sunday Times Short Story Award in 2019
 Irish Times Book Club choice

References 

Irish short story collections
2015 short story collections